Batrachedra auricomella is a species of moth of the family Batrachedridae. It is found in Russia.

References

Batrachedridae
Moths described in 1993